Chak 21 S.B. is a village, four kilometers away in south from Kot Momin, towards (Chowki Bhagat/Mateela road) in Sargodha District , it is the largest village of Union Council 38 of Tehsil Kot Momin. This village came into existence on the South Branch Canal created in 1901 by the British to cultivate land . In this village the most prominent persons were Peer Syed fazail Hussain Shah Bukhari (late), Peer Syed Tahir Abbas Sherazi Gadi Nasheen Darbar e Aaliya chak 21 janoobi
Syed Abid jafferi
Syed Muhammad Ali Shah
Syed Nasir Raza
, Choudhary Ghulam Hussain Jethal (late) and 
Choudhary Safdar Ali Kahana (late) and Rana Anayat Ali Noon (late)

Chak 21 S.B. is now developing as the ratio of literacy is rising, the people of this village are struggling for the betterment of the village.
 

ln this village there are two major tribes the sunnis and shiites. There are school for girls and for boys as well as government and private . There is a ground for boys to play 

The people living here there major source of income is the Mandarin, the village is associated with facilities like natural gas, electricity and roads. The climate of this village in summer is about 40 °C, and in winter it reaches also 4 °C. In this village there are 5 mosques and 2 Shiite prayer places. This village has 2 graveyards. This village 90% consists of the families who derive from Jehlum.
Major families in the village are:

Kahana- From Kahani Pind Dadan Khan Tehsil
Gondals - From Dhudian, Lilla Town and Kahani ( Pind Daden Khan District Jehlum)
Jethal- From Jethal in Pind Dadan Khan Tehsil
Janjuas  (Raja)
Syed
Noon from Burkan Noona
Bhikh
Aura - From Gujar Khan Tehsil
Sheikh
Jutt

Most of the families are associated with agriculture. Area is best for the production of Kinno (Mondarian). Its exported to Central Asian countries and Europe .

Literacy rate is around 60%. There is one middle school for boys and also one elementary  school for girls. The authorities are not giving proper attentions to the village , there is a connecting major road which lastly was built before 2000 and its destructed completely .  

Populated places in Sargodha District